Friend Zone is a 2009 Spanish romantic comedy film co-written and directed by Borja Cobeaga and starring Gorka Otxoa and Sabrina Garciarena.

Premise
Chema has dumped his longtime girlfriend because he thinks he can do better, but after trying to date new girls, he is not very successful. When he meets Claudia, he thinks his luck has changed. She is pretty, funny, and seems interested in him. This apparent luck runs out when Sebastián, Claudia's actual boyfriend, comes over from Argentina and it becomes apparent that Claudia only wants Chema as her friend, so he is faced with the choice of giving up on a girl he does not stand a chance of getting, or waiting for the opportunity to present itself.

Cast

Awards and nominations

24th Goya Awards

See also 
 List of Spanish films of 2009

References

External links
 

2009 films
2009 romantic comedy films
Films shot in Spain
Spanish romantic comedy films
2000s Spanish films